Jackament's Bridge Halt railway station served RAF Kemble, on the boundary of Gloucestershire and Wiltshire, England. It was open between 1939 and 1948.

History
The halt opened on 3 July 1939. There was one wooden platform, with no shelter. It was initially opened for the benefit of the construction workers engaged on building Kemble Airfield for the RAF. For these, one morning train was provided from Cirencester which arrived at 7:10 am, with an evening return service departing at 5:20 pm; but once the airfield was complete, all trains on the Tetbury branch called at the station.

It closed on 27 September 1948.

References

External links
Jackament's Bridge Halt on navigable 1948 O.S. map

Disused railway stations in Gloucestershire
Former Great Western Railway stations
Railway stations in Great Britain opened in 1939
Railway stations in Great Britain closed in 1948